Edward Brocket (1490/91–1558/69), of Broadfield and Letchworth, Hertfordshire, was an English politician.

He was a Member (MP) of the Parliament of England for Hertfordshire in 1542? and November 1554.

References

1490s births
16th-century deaths
Members of the Parliament of England for Hertfordshire
English MPs 1542–1544
English MPs 1554–1555